Luddendenfoot or Luddenden Foot is a community in Calderdale, West Yorkshire, England. The population of Luddendenfoot is 2,547, with the wider Calderdale Ward (of the same name) at the 2011 Census as 10,653. It lies along the Upper Calder Valley below the village of Luddenden, between Sowerby Bridge and Mytholmroyd

History
The settlement grew up around the confluence of Luddenden Brook and the River Calder and the existence of the woollen textile industry. The industrial growth facilitated by the opening of the Rochdale Canal in 1804 and the opening of the Manchester and Leeds Railway in 1840. There were several mills including Boy Mill, Luddendenfoot Mill, Delph Mill and Denholme Mill.  None of these mills remain in their original use.

Between 1840 and 1962 the village was served by Luddendenfoot railway station.

Luddendenfoot grew up around the industry along the river and brook, then later the canal; then the railway and then the A646 Burnley Road.

In the late part of the 20th Century; many houses along Burnley Road were cleared and a new housing estate at Kershaw was developed.  In the early 21st Century; housing has been built on a cleared mill site in the centre of the village.

Governance
Luddendenfoot had a Local Board of Health from 1868 until 1894, in 1894 an Urban District Council was established.  Luddendenfoot was absorbed into Sowerby Bridge in 1937 and remained part of Sowerby Bridge Urban District until the formation of the  metropolitan borough of Calderdale in 1974, which is administered from Halifax.

The settlement is part of the Luddendenfoot ward of the part of the metropolitan county of West Yorkshire.  The Luddendenfoot ward covers a wider area and includes the villages of Mytholmroyd, Luddenden, Midgley, Booth, Wainstalls, Cragg Vale and Boulderclough.

The ward has, over the years, elected councillors from all of the three main parties. However, as of May 2019, all three seats are held by Labour councillors and this is the first time this has happened since 1973. The current councillors by date elected are Jane Scullion (Deputy Leader of Calderdale), Scott Patient and Roisin Cavanagh.

Education
There are two primary schools in Luddendenfoot;  Luddendenfoot Academy, formerly Luddendenfoot Junior and Infant School and Luddenden CE School.

Cultural reference and notable people

 Luddendenfoot is the subject of a poem by Simon Armitage, in which he comments on the rumoured pagan practices of the town.
 The actor Peter Alexander, who starred in Emmerdale Farm and numerous pantomimes in Yorkshire, lives here. 
Luddenden was also used as the exterior funeral parlour for the then Yorkshire Television's In Loving Memory.
The Rochdale Canal in the village was used as a filming location in Happy Valley 

Luddendenfoot Rugby League Club appeared in the first round of the Rugby League Challenge Cup in 1899 as an amateur side, losing 63–3 away at Salford.
Branwell Brontë worked at Luddendenfoot Railway Station in 1841

See also
Listed buildings in Luddendenfoot

Gallery

References

External links

 Luddendenfoot Junior & Infant School website
Sowerby Bridge Chronicle newspaper website

Villages in West Yorkshire
Geography of Calderdale
Wards of Calderdale